Pierre Venteau (born 26 August 1974) is a French politician of La République En Marche! (LREM) who was member of the National Assembly from 2019 to 2022, representing Haute-Vienne's 2nd constituency. As his substitute, he replaced Jean-Baptiste Djebbari in Parliament when he was appointed Minister for Transport in the Second Philippe government.

References 

Living people
1974 births
21st-century French politicians

La République En Marche! politicians
Deputies of the 15th National Assembly of the French Fifth Republic
People from Haute-Vienne
Members of Parliament for Haute-Vienne